Utricularia microcalyx is a small to medium-sized annual carnivorous plant that belongs to the genus Utricularia. It is native to tropical Africa, where it can be found in the Democratic Republic of the Congo and Zambia. It typically flowers between February and July. It was originally described and published by Peter Taylor in 1964 as a variety of U. welwitschii. Taylor elevated this variety to the species level in 1971.

See also 
 List of Utricularia species

References 

Carnivorous plants of Africa
Flora of the Democratic Republic of the Congo
Flora of Zambia
microcalyx